Daniel Timofte (born 1 October 1967) is a Romanian football manager and former player who played as an attacking midfielder, most notably for Turkish club Samsunspor.

Club career
Timofte debuted in Divizia A with Jiul Petroșani in 1986. The team was relegated that season, but Timofte helped them earn promotion again before he joined Dinamo București in 1989. The following season, he won the double with Dinamo. He later played in Germany and Turkey, and he retired in 2000 after his third spell with Dinamo.

Timofte made his debut for the Romania national team in 1990 against Egypt, scoring in his debut match. At the 1990 FIFA World Cup he had a penalty kick saved in the penalty shootout against Ireland by Packie Bonner in the round of sixteen, which caused Romania's exit from the tournament. Timofte got 22 caps in total, the last in 1995, and scored two goals.

Timofte played for Dinamo București against St Patrick's Athletic in the 1990–91 European Cup. In Tolka Park, Dublin, the Irish home fans gave him mocking cheers for his shootout miss. A Bayer Uerdingen scout was at the match, which led to his transfer to Germany.

His football career was cut short by a knee injury. He returned to Petroșani and opened a number of bars, the first named "Penalty".

Between June and September 2013 he was the assistant coach of Liga I giants Dinamo București being part of the managing team led by Gheorghe Mulțescu.

Honours

Player
Jiul Petroșani
Liga II: 1988–89

Dinamo București
Liga I: 1989–90, 1999–00
Romanian Cup: 1989–90, 1999-00

Bayer Uerdingen
2. Bundesliga: 1991–92

Samsunspor
Balkans Cup: 1993–94

Coach
Dacia Unirea Braila
Liga III: 2009–10

References

External links

Timofte coaching photo

1967 births
Living people
People from Petrila
Romanian footballers
Romania international footballers
Romanian expatriate footballers
1990 FIFA World Cup players
CSM Jiul Petroșani players
FC Dinamo București players
KFC Uerdingen 05 players
Samsunspor footballers
Liga I players
Bundesliga players
Süper Lig players
Expatriate footballers in Germany
Expatriate footballers in Turkey
Romanian football managers
AFC Dacia Unirea Brăila managers
FC Sportul Studențesc București managers
CSM Jiul Petroșani managers
Association football midfielders